Des O'Connor (1932–2020) was an English entertainer, singer and television presenter. Des O'Connor may also refer to:

Des O'Connor (rugby league), Australian rugby player
Desmond O'Connor (cabaret performer)